Patrice Siolo (born 23 February 1994) is a New Zealand professional rugby league footballer who currently plays for the Western Suburbs Magpies in the Intrust Super Premiership NSW.

Background
Born in Auckland, New Zealand, Siolo moved to Sydney, New South Wales at a young age and played his junior rugby league for the Mascot Jets. He was then signed by the South Sydney Rabbitohs.

Playing career

Early career
In 2012, Siolo joined the Cronulla-Sutherland Sharks and played for their NYC team until 2014.

2014
In Round 25 of the 2014 NRL season, Siolo made his NRL debut for the Sharks against the North Queensland Cowboys.

2016
In 2016, Siolo returned to the South Sydney Rabbitohs and played off the interchange bench in the Rabbitohs' annual pre-season Charity Shield match against the St. George Illawarra Dragons on 13 February. He made his Rabbitohs NRL debut in Round 9 against the Wests Tigers. He spent most of the 2016 season playing for the Rabbitohs' Intrust Super Premiership NSW team, North Sydney Bears, making a total of 17 appearances and scoring 1 try.

2017
On 28 August, Siolo was selected in the 2017 Ron Massey Cup Team of the Year while playing for The Concord-Burwood-Glebe Wolves.

2018
In January 2018, Siolo joined Intrust Super Premiership NSW side The Western Suburbs Magpies.

References

External links

Cronulla-Sutherland Sharks profile

1994 births
People educated at Matraville Sports High School
New Zealand rugby league players
Cronulla-Sutherland Sharks players
South Sydney Rabbitohs players
Newtown Jets NSW Cup players
North Sydney Bears NSW Cup players
Rugby league second-rows
Rugby league locks
Living people
Sunshine Coast Falcons players